The 1934 Catalan local elections were held on 14 January to elect the municipal councils in all the 1,029 municipalities of Catalonia. These elections were only held in Catalonia, as the 1932 Statute of Autonomy devolved the competences on local elections to the Generalitat de Catalunya.
These were the first and only election to be organised by the Catalan Government, since this administration was suppressed by the Dictatorship of Francisco Franco in 1939, after winning the Spanish Civil War. The following free local elections were not held until 1979, during the transition to democracy.

Electoral system
The electoral system was determined by the Municipal Law, which was approved by the Parliament of Catalonia in August 1933. The elections were scheduled to be held in November 1933, but they were delayed to January in order not to interfere with the 1933 general election.
The municipal council seats of all the 1,029 municipalities of Catalonia were up for election. The population-seat relationship on each municipality was to be established on the following scale:

All the councillors were elected in single multi-member districts, consisting of the municipality's territory, using closed lists. 
The allocation of seats depended on the population:
 In municipalities under 10,000 inhabitants: the winning list obtained two-thirds to four-fifths of the seats in the council, the second party obtained the remaining seats.
 In municipalities over 10,000 inhabitants: the winning list obtained 65% of the seats in the council, the second party obtained the 65% of the remaining seats, the third party obtained the 65% of the remaining seats and so on. If at the end there were still unfilled seats, these would be won by the last party having received a seat.

The mayors were elected on the first plenary session by the councillors. Candidates obtaining an absolute majority on a first or second round were elected. If none of the candidates had achieved an absolute majority, a third round would have been held, where the candidate with plurality would be elected.

Results

Overall

Turnout was 59.8%, lower than the 1931 elections, but similar to the 1933 general election.
The highest abstention rates were found in towns across the Pyrenees. The left-wing parties got a majority of votes, specially in Penedès and in the metropolitan area of Barcelona.
The right-wing parties made their best results in Solsonès, Segarra and Alt Urgell, and they won in cities like Girona, Vic, Olot or El Vendrell.

Juditial district capitals

Vote share

In the following table, background-coloured rows indicate the winning list in a municipality.

Elected councillors by political party

In the following table, background-coloured rows indicate the ruling parties in a municipality.

See also
 1934 Barcelona City Council election
 Events of 6 October

References

External links
1934 local elections in Catalonia 

1934
1934 elections in Spain
1934 in Catalonia
Local elections in Catalonia